Ned is an English given name and variant of Ed, sometimes short for Edward, Edmund, Edgar, or Edwin. Ned can also be a diminutive for the Slavic name Nedeljko.

People with the given name Ned, or its variants
 Ned Abraham (born 1961), Austrian surgeon
 Ted Alley (1881–1949), former Australian rules footballer listed in some sources as Ned Alley
 Edward Almond (1892–1979), United States Army general best known as the commander of the Army's X Corps during the Korean War
 Ned Ambler (born 1968 or 1969), American photographer and talent scout 
 Ned Austin (1925–2007), American actor
 Ned Azemia (born 1997), Seychellois hurdler
 Ned Barkas (1901–1962), English professional footballer
 Ned Beatty  (1937–2021), American actor
 Ned Bellamy (born 1957), American actor
 Ned Benson (born 1977), American filmmaker
 Ned Bittinger (born 1951), American artist
 Ned Block (born 1942), American philosopher
 Ned Bouhalassa (born 1962), Canadian composer
 Ned Boulting (born 1969), British sports journalist and television presenter
 Ned Buntline (1821 or 1823–1886), American publisher, journalist, writer, and publicist
 Ned Cameron (born 1987), American singer, songwriter, and record producer
 Ned Catic (born 1978), Australian rugby league footballer
 Ned Chaillet (born 1944), American-born British radio drama producer and director, writer and journalist
 Ned Cobb (1885–1973), American tenant farmer
 Ned Collette (born 1979), Australian musician and singer-songwriter
 Ned Crotty (born 1986), American lacrosse player
 Ned Cuthbert (1845–1905), American baseball player
 Ned Daly (1891–1916), Dublin's 1st battalion commandant during the 1916 Easter Rising
 Ned Dameron, American science fiction and fantasy artist
 Ned Davis (1886–1961), Australian politician
 Ned Day (1945–1987), American television journalist 
 Ned Dennehy (born 1965), Irish actor
 Ned Donaghy, American soccer referee active in the 1920s and 1930s
 Ned Dowd (born 1950), American film producer and former actor
 Ned Eckersley (born 1989), English cricketer
 Ned Eisenberg (1957-2022), American actor
 Ned Endress (1918–2010), American basketball player
 Ned Evett (born 1967), American guitarist, singer, and songwriter 
 Ned Fairchild (1929–2015), American songwriter
 Ned Freed (born 1959), American software developer
 Ned Garver (1925–2017), American baseball pitcher
 Ned Glass (1906–1984), American character actor
 Ned Goldreyer, American television writer, television producer and comedian
 Ned Gregory (1839–1899), Australian cricketer
 Ned Hanlan (1855–1908), Canadian professional sculler, hotelier and alderman
 Ned Harris (1916–1976), American baseball player
 Ned Herrmann (1922–1999), creator of the Herrmann Brain Dominance Instrument
 Ned Hollister (1876–1924), American biologist
 Ned Irish (1905–1982), American basketball promoter
 Ned Jarrett (born 1932), American race car driver
 Ned Jenkins (1904–1990), Welsh rugby union player
 Ned Kelly (1850s–1880), Australian outlaw and folk hero
 Ned Lamont (born 1954), American businessman and politician, 89th Governor of Connecticut
 Ned Luke (born 1958), American actor
 Ned Maddrell (1877–1974), Manx fisherman
 Ned Markosian, American philosopher
 Ned Martel, American television writer and producer
 Ned Martin (1923–2002), American sportscaster
 Ned McGowan (lawyer) (1813–1893), American lawyer and politician
 Ned McHenry (born 2000), Australian rules footballer
 Ned McWherter (1930–2011), American politician
 Ned Merriam (1884–1956), American track athlete, football player, and coach
 Ned Mettam (1868–1943), English footballer
 Ned Miller (1925–2016), American country music singer-songwriter
 Ned O'Connor (1877–1956), Australian rules footballer
 Ned Officer (1869–1927), Australian rules footballer
 Ned O'Gorman (1929–2014), American poet and educator
 Ned O'Keeffe (born 1942), Irish politician
 Ned O'Sullivan (born 1950), Irish politician
 Ned Palmer, Britsh cheesemonger and author
 Ned Price (born 1982), American Spokesperson for the United States Department of State
 Ned Rorem (1923–2022), American composer and writer
 Ned Scott (1907-1967), American photographer who worked in the Hollywood film industry
 Ned Sherrin (1931–2007), British impresario, writer, game show host and raconteur
 Ned Sparks (1883–1957), Canadian character actor
 Ned Sublette (born 1951), American composer, musician, record producer, musicologist, and author
 Ned Vizzini (1981–2013), American writer
 Ned Yost (born 1955), American baseball player and manager

Fictional characters
 Ned, the main character from the television series Pushing Daisies
 Ned Flanders, a character from The Simpsons
 Ned Nickerson, the boyfriend of Nancy Drew in the novels of the same name
 Ned Stark, a character from the A Song of Ice and Fire series
 Ned, a character from the television series The Tribe
 Ned Bigby, the main protagonist of Ned's Declassified School Survival Guide
 Ned Dorneget, a Cyber Division Special Agent in the police series NCIS
 Ned Flemkin, the titular character from the Canadian animated television series Ned's Newt
 Ned Gerblansky, a character from South Park
 Ned Quartermaine, a character from the soap opera General Hospital
 Ned, short for Nedwin, a character from the 2011 fantasy novel Beyonders: A World Without Heroes
 Ned Dorsey, one of the two main characters from the television series Ned & Stacey
 Ned Land, a character from the 1870 adventure novel Twenty Thousand Leagues Under the Sea
 Ned Merrill, a character from the 1964 short story "The Swimmer"
 Ned Nederlander, one of the three protagonists in the 1986 western comedy Three Amigos
 Ned Needlemeyer, titular character from the short-lived 1997 animated series Nightmare Ned
 Ned Plimpton, a character from the 2004 film The Life Aquatic with Steve Zissou
 Ned Racine, a character from the 1981 film Body Heat
Ned Ryder, a character from the 1945 novel Brideshead Revisited
 Ned Ryerson, a character from the 1993 comedy Groundhog Day
 Ned Schneebly, a character from the 2003 comedy School of Rock
 Ned, a creature in the music video for "Chlorine", a song by the band Twenty One Pilots
 Neddie Seagoon, a character in The Goon Show
 Ned Leeds, a character in Marvel Comics
 Ned, titular host of talk show set in outer space, Earth to Ned
 Ned Banks, a character from the Ghost Whisperer

References

Hypocorisms
English masculine given names